Humber Mouth is a literary festival in Hull, England, that started in 1992.

References

External links
 

Literary festivals in England
Culture in Kingston upon Hull
Festivals established in 1992